Boletellus fibuliger is a species of fungus in the family Boletaceae. Found in Venezuela, it was described as new to science in 1983 by mycologist Rolf Singer.

References

External links

Fungi described in 1983
Fungi of Venezuela
fibuliger
Taxa named by Rolf Singer